Guanajuato is a Mexican state.

Guanajuato may also refer to

Guanajuato, Guanajuato, the capital city of the homonymous state
Guanajuato River, a river in central Mexico
Universidad de Guanajuato (in English, the University of Guanajuato), a university based in the Mexican state of Guanajuato
ARM Guanajuato, a Durango class oceanic patrol vessel in the Mexican Navy
Guanajuato mud turtle (Kinosternon integrum), a species of mud turtle in the family Kinosternidae